Yang Kang is the fictional antagonist in the wuxia novel The Legend of the Condor Heroes by Jin Yong (Louis Cha). He also serves as a foil to Guo Jing, the protagonist due to their similar  backgrounds.

Birth and heritage
Yang Kang's hometown is in Niu Family Village. His father, Yang Tiexin, was originally from Shandong but moved to Lin'an (present-day Hangzhou) after the Jurchen-led Jin Empire conquered the northern part of the predominantly Han Chinese Song Empire. Yang Tiexin met Bao Xiruo in the neighbouring town, Hongmei Village, and married her. Two years after their marriage, Yang Tiexin was apparently killed when soldiers raided the village. Bao Xiruo was heavily pregnant with Yang Kang then, and was rescued by Wanyan Honglie, the sixth prince of the Jin Empire. She gave birth to Yang Kang, who was raised as a Jurchen noble and adopted his foster father's family name, "Wanyan". He was initially known as "Wanyan Kang" before his real identity is revealed.

Yang's given name, "Kang", is the complementary of his sworn brother's "Jing". Together, their given names form "Jingkang". Their fathers and Qiu Chuji named them as such to remind them of the Jingkang Incident and to be loyal to their native land, the Song Empire. Yang Kang is also a descendant of Yang Zaixing, a Song general who participated in the Jin–Song Wars.

Treachery and retribution
Yang Kang discovers his true heritage when Yang Tiexin, who was supposedly killed many years ago, suddenly reappears in front of Bao Xiruo. Bao Xiruo tries to explain to her son that Yang Tiexin is his father. However, Yang Kang refuses to acknowledge Yang Tiexin as his father. To him, Wanyan Honglie is a fatherly figure who showers love and care on him and provides him with everything he wants. In fact, Wanyan Honglie is responsible for the deaths of Yang Kang's parents: Yang Tiexin and Bao Xiruo commit suicide after being cornered by Wanyan Honglie and his men.

When Yang Kang finally meets his sworn brother, Guo Jing, the latter attempts to persuade him to take the Song Empire's side. Although Yang Kang initially agreed to join the Song Empire, he changes his mind later after witnessing how the Han Chinese society of the Song Empire is plagued by problems such as political corruption, internal conflict, and cowardice in the face of Jurchen aggression. Disgusted, Yang Kang succumbs to the temptation of being a Jurchen noble and denounces his ethnicity again. He collaborates with the Jurchens to exploit his own race (the Han Chinese) and pretends to have acknowledged his ethnicity. At one point, he attempts to kill Guo Jing by stabbing him with a dagger when Guo tries to persuade him to revert again. He murders Ouyang Ke so that he can take the latter's place as Ouyang Feng's apprentice. Yang Kang is also responsible for the deaths of five of the "Seven Freaks of Jiangnan", and for framing Guo Jing for the murder of Ouyang Ke.

Yang Kang gets his retribution in the Temple of the Iron Spear in Jiaxing. Huang Rong is about to reveal the truth behind the deaths of Ouyang Ke and the Freaks when Yang Kang attacks her with a palm strike in an attempt to silence her. However, he accidentally hits the spikes on her soft armour, which is stained with venom from a deadly breed of snakes. The poison seeps through the wounds into his body and kills him eventually. Ironically, the venom that killed Yang Kang was used by him to kill one of the Freaks. Ouyang Feng refuses to save Yang Kang when he learns that the latter was the one who murdered Ouyang Ke.

Yang Kang dies a slow and painful death in the temple as the poison works its way through his body. Wanyan Honglie and his men abandon him for fear of being infected. Before dying, Yang Kang finally sees his mistakes after Wanyan Honglie left and blames him for his plight but is too late. When Guo Jing reaches the temple, he is horrified to see that Yang Kang's corpse had been devoured by crows and ravens. He buried whatever that is left of Yang Kang outside the temple. Yang Kang's teacher, Qiu Chuji, arrives later and constructs a tomb for his apprentice after Ke Zhen'e informed him about the incident. Qiu Chuji writes on the headstone: "Yang Kang, an unworthy apprentice. Erected by his untalented master, Qiu Chuji."

Love relationship with Mu Nianci
Yang Kang meets his love interest, Mu Nianci, for the first time in a martial arts contest for a spouse. He defeats her but refuses to marry her after his victory. He is unaware that Mu Nianci's foster father, Mu Yi, is actually his biological father, Yang Tiexin. However, their romance is often strained as they have conflicting views over where their loyalties lie. Yang Kang wants to remain as a Jurchen noble and indulge in wealth, fame and power, while Mu Nianci remains loyal to the Song Empire.

Mu Nianci is disappointed with Yang Kang when she recognises his treachery and stubborn refusal to acknowledge his ethnicity. She sees him as a traitor and decides to leave him for good. She never saw him again. However, she is already pregnant with his child. She gives birth to a boy, who is named "Yang Guo" by Guo Jing.

Martial arts and skills

Quanzhen School
Qiu Chuji of the Quanzhen School finds Yang Kang and accepts him as a student upon learning that the boy is Yang Tiexin's son. He teaches Yang Kang some Quanzhen martial arts to prepare for an upcoming contest with Guo Jing, as well as some skills he created to counter the "Seven Freaks of Jiangnan". Yang Kang also learnt an incomplete set of the Yang Family Spear Movement from Qiu Chuji, whose knowledge of the skill is based on recollections of his encounter with Yang Tiexin.

Nine Yin White Bone Claw
Yang Kang learns from Mei Chaofeng the Nine Yin White Bone Claw, an unorthodox version of the skills in the Nine Yin Manual. He stumbled upon her hiding place and agreed to provide her with food and shelter. In return, she taught him the 'Claw'.

In film and television
Notable actors who have portrayed Yang Kang in films and television series include Bruce Leung (1976), Michael Miu (1983), Gallen Lo (1994), Zhou Jie (2003), Yuan Hong (2008) and Chen Xingxu (2017).

Family tree

Notes

References
  Tan, Xianmao (2005). Yang Kang: The Incorrigible Miscreant Who Acknowledges a Villain as His Father. In Rankings of Jin Yong's Characters. Chinese Agricultural Press.

Jin Yong characters
The Legend of the Condor Heroes
Condor Trilogy
Fictional wushu practitioners
Fictional murderers
Fictional adoptees
Fictional Song dynasty people
Fictional Han people
Fictional characters from Beijing